NGC 2064 is a reflection nebula in the constellation Orion.  It was discovered on January 11, 1864 by Heinrich d'Arrest. It is part of a group of nebulae, that also includes Messier 78, NGC 2071 and NGC 2067.

External links 
 The Interactive NGC Catalog Online: NGC 2064
 NASA/IPAC Extragalactic Database: NGC 2064

References

Reflection nebulae
Orion (constellation)
Orion molecular cloud complex
2064